Isa Souza was born on January 26, 1975, in Santa Rosa a small town in southern Brazil. While she grew up, she visited Argentina many times and due to the European and Latin American cultural mix she learned to speak Portuguese (native), English and Spanish.

On her early years, Isa lived in a farm with her three sisters and an older brother, as well as her father, who taught her about the importance of taking care of nature, eating healthy and growing organic food.

Education 

Isa Souza has studied cuisine at different culinary schools around the world, including The French Culinary Institute, where she became a professional Chef in 2011, learning techniques from Master Chefs Herve Malivert and Dave Arnold. She was also influenced by French Chef Alain Ducasse and Spaniard Chef José Andrés, two internationally recognized professionals in culinary arts.

The International Chef has practiced international law in the European Union, after obtaining a MA in Law while she studied in Brazil and Spain.

Career 

Chef Isa uses different cooking techniques such as Sous Vide, which retains essential nutrients and juices in food. She is also an advocate for Eco-gastronomy, the Slow Food Movement and using seasonal organics whenever she prepares American, Italian, Thai and Tunisian recipes, her specialties.

Her career has allowed her to participate in different events and productions, most noticeably the TV show Isa Vida y Sabor, as well as The International Festival Du Pain, a high end culinary competition in Tunisia where she was invited as a judge. In 2013 she wrote the book Isa Vida y Sabor to share some of her recipes and techniques with a broader audience.

Isa supports some non profit and community organizations including the Human Rights Campaign(HRC), the St. Jude Cancer Institute and the Slow Food organization.

References

Brazilian chefs
1975 births
Living people
People from Santa Rosa, Rio Grande do Sul